Mary Owen may refer to:
Mary Owen (hymnwriter) (1796–1875), Welsh hymnwriter
Mary Owen (activist) (1921–2017), Australian feminist and activist
Mary Alicia Owen (died 1935), Missouri folklore collector
Mary Jane Owen, American disability rights activist